Sparta is a city in Randolph County, Illinois, United States. The population was 4,095 at the 2020 census.

The city was the principal filming location for the 1967 film In the Heat of the Night.

Consumer ammunition manufacturer Underwood ammo is headquartered and solely based in Sparta.

Geography

Sparta is located at  (38.1282, −89.7061).

Printing industry
After World War II, Sparta became known as "Magazineland, U.S.A." due to the presence of numerous printing plants that produced most of the mass-market color comic books in the United States. Spartan Printing employed as many as 1,000 people at its peak. Later, major comics distributors situated their warehouses in and around Sparta.

Sparta was featured in the sixteenth episode of the Small Town News Podcast, an improv comedy podcast that takes listeners on a fun and silly virtual trip to a small town in America each week, in which the hosts improvise scenes inspired by local newspaper stories.

World Shooting and Recreational Complex
In 2005, the expansion of the Dayton International Airport forced the Amateur Trapshooting Association (ATA) to relocate from its previous headquarters in Vandalia, Ohio.  The association chose to move to the vicinity of Sparta, following extensive lobbying by the city and the state.
  
In 2006, then-Illinois Governor Rod Blagojevich and local dignitaries opened the World Shooting and Recreational Complex north of Sparta. The ATA hosted its first Grand American at the facility in August, with several thousand shooters attending.

In 2012 the ATA moved their national headquarters to 1105 East Broadway, Sparta, Illinois. All day-to-day operations for the Association are now handled at this location.

Demographics

As of the census of 2000, there were 4,486 people, 1,783 households, and 1,164 families residing in the city. The racial makeup of the city was 81.39% White, 15.65% African American, 0.36% Native American, 0.51% Asian, 0.27% from other races, and 1.83% from two or more races. Hispanic or Latino of any race were 1.36% of the population.

There were 1,783 households, out of which 30.8% had children under the age of 18 living with them, 47.9% were married couples living together, 13.8% had a female householder with no husband present, and 34.7% were non-families. 30.0% of all households were made up of individuals, and 14.4% had someone living alone who was 65 years of age or older. The average household size was 2.42 and the average family size was 3.01.

In the city, the population was spread out, with 25.6% under the age of 18, 8.0% from 18 to 24, 24.8% from 25 to 44, 23.0% from 45 to 64, and 18.6% who were 65 years of age or older. The median age was 39 years. For every 100 females, there were 83.4 males. For every 100 females age 18 and over, there were 79.4 males.

The median income for a household in the city was $34,139, and the median income for a family was $41,908. Males had a median income of $30,386 versus $19,819 for females. The per capita income for the city was $16,343. About 10.9% of families and 16.0% of the population were below the poverty line, including 27.3% of those under age 18 and 4.2% of those age 65 or over.

Notable people

 Earle Gardner, infielder for the New York Highlanders
 Darius Jackson, running back for the Dallas Cowboys
 John Wittenborn, kicker for San Francisco 49ers, Philadelphia Eagles, and Houston Oilers

References

External links
City website
Randolph County Herald Tribune
World Shooting and Recreational Complex

Cities in Randolph County, Illinois
Cities in Illinois